Reckless is the fourth studio album by Canadian singer-songwriter Bryan Adams. Released on 5 November 1984 (Adams' 25th birthday) by A&M Records, the album was co-produced by Adams and Bob Clearmountain, and is considered Adams' most successful solo album. The album has reached 12 million album sales worldwide. It was the first Canadian album to sell more than a million copies within Canada. The album reached number 1 on the Billboard 200 and reached high positions on album charts worldwide.

Six singles were released from the album: "Run to You", "Somebody", "Heaven", "Summer of '69", "One Night Love Affair", and "It's Only Love". All six singles made the top 15 on the US Billboard Hot 100, which had been accomplished previously only by Michael Jackson's Thriller  and Bruce Springsteen's Born in the USA. The album was ranked No. 49 on Kerrang!s "100 Greatest Heavy Metal Albums of All Time" in 1989, and 99th Greatest Rock Album of All Time by Classic Rock and was also named the number 12 Greatest Canadian Album of All Time by Bob Mersereau in his book The Top 100 Canadian Albums. The album was recorded at Little Mountain Sound Studios, Vancouver, Canada. On 12 December 2009 the syndicated radio program In the Studio celebrated the 25th anniversary of the album.

A 30th Anniversary edition of the album, featuring previously unreleased material and a brand new 5.1 surround mix, was released on 10 November 2014 in both four and two-disc editions. The Reckless 30th Anniversary Tour also took place in November 2014, consisting of eleven exclusive arena shows in the UK.

Music

Recording and production 
The first song recorded was "Heaven", which had been co-written by Adams and Jim Vallance for the film A Night in Heaven. The song was recorded at the Power Station in New York on June 6–7, 1983 and was mixed on June 16, 1983 with Bob Clearmountain co-producing and engineering. Despite having been released on the film's soundtrack album, the song was initially not considered suitable for Reckless, only being added to the album at the last minute.

In March 1984, recording sessions for Reckless began after Adams completed an extensive concert tour promoting his previous album, Cuts Like a Knife. However, unhappy with the recording process, Adams decided to take a month off from the sessions that summer. In August 1984, Adams returned to the studio to record the track "It's Only Love" with Tina Turner; he also had written new songs and began re-recording songs which would lead to the development of such tracks as "Run to You" and  "Summer of '69".

"Run to You" was recorded after a tour in Asia. The recording for "Run to You" began on March 27, 1984 and continued through the summer at Little Mountain Sound Studios, Vancouver. The track was first mixed in New York by Bob Clearmountain, with final mixing of the song completed on September 21, 1984. "Summer of '69" was written on January 25, 1984 with Jim Vallance. Sessions took place at Little Mountain Sound Studios where three different recordings of the song were made over the winter. The final version was mixed in New York by Bob Clearmountain on November 22, 1984.

Songs 
"Run to You" was released as the debut single from Reckless on  October 18, 1984 in North America and became one of the most successful songs from the album on the American pop and rock charts; it would become one of Adams' most popular and recognizable songs. The song was Adams' first number one hit on the Billboard Top Rock Tracks chart, a position it held for four weeks, and reached number six on the Billboard Hot 100. The song entered the top 20 on the Canadian singles chart and remained in the top 20 for seven weeks, peaking at number 4. With "Run to You", Adams reached the highest Canadian chart position in his career to that time; it was his third top 20 hit single in Canada. "Run to You" was released in November 1984 in Europe where it peaked at number 8 in Ireland and reached number 11 on the UK Singles Chart; it was his second single to chart in Europe.

"Somebody" was issued as a single in January, 1985 and became one of the most successful songs from Reckless on the American rock charts. The song was Adams' second number one hit on the Billboard Top Rock Tracks chart and reached number 11 on the Billboard Hot 100. "Somebody" was in the top 20 on the Canadian singles chart for six weeks; it was Adams' fourth top 20 hit on the Canadian chart. "Somebody" was released in Europe during February, 1985 and peaked at number 20 in Ireland and reached the top 40 on the UK Singles Chart at number 35; it was Adams' third single to chart in Europe.

"Heaven" was the third single issued from Reckless. The record reached number 1 on the Billboard Hot 100 chart for two weeks in June 1985; the song previously peaked at number 9 on the Billboard Top Tracks chart from the A Night in Heaven soundtrack album in February 1984. "Heaven" has appeared on all of Adams' compilation albums with the exception of The Best of Me. The single was certified Gold in Canada in late 1985.

Upon the release of Reckless in November 1984, "Summer of '69" received some airplay on album-oriented rock radio stations, but was mostly overshadowed by the tracks "Run to You" and "It's Only Love"; it managed only to reach number 40 on Billboard's Top Rock Tracks chart. After it was released as a single in June 1985, "Summer of '69" peaked at number 5 on the Billboard Hot 100.

"Summer of '69" was issued as a single in Australia, Europe and New Zealand in 1985. "Heaven" reached the UK top 40, while "Summer of '69" peaked at 42. "Summer of '69" continued the trend of higher-charting singles when it debuted and peaked at top 20 in most of the European countries it charted. Adams' previous singles had charted much weaker in Europe and "Summer of '69" would be Adams' second single to chart in mainland Europe.

Although "Summer of '69" reached the top 10 in Norway and then the top 20 in the Austria, Ireland and Sweden, it was a moderate top 100 success in Germany, where it peaked at 62.

"Summer of '69" co-writer Jim Vallance has always gone for the more conventional interpretation of the title being a reference to the year 1969. He notes Jackson Browne's "Running on Empty", which contains references to 1965 and 1969, as his own influence, and recalls that Adams cited the film Summer of '42 as his own reference.

Released in September 1985, "One Night Love Affair" was the fifth and final single drawn from Reckless, peaking on the Billboard Hot 100 chart at number 13 and at number 7 on the Top Rock Tracks chart. "One Night Love Affair" had been officially released to Canadian radio stations in February 1985. The song reached the top 20 on the Canadian Singles Chart and remained  there for another month. "One Night Love Affair" was the lowest charting single from Reckless.

While never issued as a single, "Kids Wanna Rock" received some airplay on album-oriented rock stations in the United States and Canada, enabling it to reach the Billboard Top Rock Tracks chart, where it peaked at number 42.  Due to its popularity in concert, "Kids Wanna Rock" was included on Adams' 1993 greatest hits collection, So Far So Good.

Critical reception 

Soon after its release, Reckless peaked at number 6 on the Billboard 200 in January, 1985 before dropping out of the top 10. The success of the singles "Heaven" and "Summer of '69" later in the year  renewed interest in the album and it began climbing back up the chart, eventually reaching number 1 in August, 1985.  "Reckless" also reached number 1 in Canada and New Zealand, number 2 in Norway and Australia while reaching the top 10 in the United Kingdom, Switzerland and Sweden.  In Canada, the album's chart pattern was somewhat similar to that in the US – it entered the top 10 shortly after its release peaking at number 1 in February the dropping out of the top 10 for three months between May and July, 1985.  It re-entered the top 10 in August, 1985, where it remained until February, 1986 with the peak of its second top 10 run being at number 4; it dropped out of the top 10 in its 67th week on the Canadian chart.

Reckless included the hit singles "Run to You", "Somebody", "Heaven", "Summer of '69", "One Night Love Affair",  and "It's Only Love". All the singles had accompanying music videos, and each one charted on the Billboard Hot 100, with "Run to You", "Summer of '69", and "Heaven" peaking in the top 10. "Heaven" would become the most successful single from Reckless in the United States at the time of its release, reaching number 1 on the Billboard Hot 100,  and number 27 on the album rock chart, although "Run to You" was a larger hit at album-oriented rock radio peaking at number 1 on the Top Rock Tracks chart for four weeks, and spending an additional five weeks at number 2, while reaching number 6 on the Billboard Hot 100.

The single "It's Only Love" was nominated for a Grammy Award for Best Rock Vocal Performance by a Duo or Group. In 1986, the song won an MTV Video Music Award for Best Stage Performance.

In June 2008, the original master tape for Reckless was destroyed in a backlot fire at Universal Studios. In 2014, Adams planned on remastering  Reckless for a boxed set commemorating the 30th anniversary of the album's release. He contacted Universal Music Group, owner of the A&M Records library, only to discover that Universal had lost the master tapes and original album artwork in the fire. Adams managed to find a copy of the master tape of Reckless at his home, which he used for the 2014 remaster.  Many point to Adams' search for answers to being the first step in uncovering the scope of the loss of Universal Music's catalog due to the fire.

Accolades

Reckless tour 
In December 1984, Adams and his touring band which consists of Keith Scott, Dave Taylor, Pat Steward and Johnny Blitz played concerts in Chicago, Detroit, New York City and Philadelphia. In early 1985, Adams started a tour throughout the United States with opening act and Canadian musician Kim Mitchell and later in Japan, Australia, Europe and finally Canada after winning four Juno Awards. Later he headed south towards the American West Coast, culminating with two dates at the Palladium in Los Angeles.

After the tour in the U.S. Adams traveled to Ethiopia to aid famine relief efforts there. Adams later went to Europe for a fifty-city concert tour with Tina Turner, culminating in April with his return to London to headline three sold-out shows at the Hammersmith Odeon. Adams began the first leg of his tour entitled "World Wide in 85" which started in Oklahoma. The tour ended in October. Adams would later visit Vancouver, and afterwards he returned to the American East Coast to play two sold-out concerts in New York.

Track listing

30th Anniversary Edition 
Disc One – Reckless outtakes
 "Let Me Down Easy" – 03:40
 "Teacher, Teacher" – 03:48
 "The Boys Night Out" – 03:53
 "Draw the Line" – 03:26
 "Play to Win" – 03:28
 "Too Hot to Handle" – 04:02
 "Reckless" – 04:01

Notably, most of the outtakes on disc one were subsequently recorded and released by other artists – "Let Me Down Easy" by Roger Daltrey (featuring Adams on guitar) on his album Under a Raging Moon; "Teacher, Teacher" by 38 Special for the soundtrack to the film Teachers; "The Boys Night Out" (as "Boys Nite Out") by Krokus on their album The Blitz; "Draw the Line" (as "(Where Do You) Draw the Line") by Ted Nugent on his album Penetrator; "Play to Win" by Fast Forward on their album Living in Fiction; and "Reckless" (as "Dangerous", with slightly altered lyrics) by Loverboy on their album Lovin' Every Minute of It.

Disc Two – Live in Hammersmith Odeon 1985
 "Remember" – 04:32
 "The Only One" – 04:39
 "It's Only Love" – 03:50
 "Kids Wanna Rock" – 03:16
 "Long Gone" – 06:21
 "Cuts Like a Knife" – 05:40
 "Lonely Nights" – 03:55
 "Tonight" – 06:13
 "This Time" – 03:37
 "The Best Was Yet to Come" – 02:43
 "Heaven" – 04:04
 "Run to You" – 04:30
 "Somebody" – 04:20
 "Straight from the Heart" – 03:17
 "Summer of '69" – 04:40

Super Deluxe Edition Box-set 
DVD – Reckless – The Movie
 "Run To You" (Intro)
 "This Time" – 3:17
 "Summer Of ’69" – 3:42
 "Somebody" – 4:45
 "Kids Wanna Rock" – 2:47
 "Heaven" – 4:11
 "Run To You" – 3:49
 "One Night Love Affair" – 4:35
 "It’s Only Love" – 6:55

Personnel 
 Bryan Adams – lead vocals, rhythm guitar (1, 2, 3, 5–10), backing vocals (2, 5, 10), handclaps (2), lead guitar (5, 9), acoustic piano (4), percussion (4), harmony vocals (6), gang vocals (7), harmonica (9)
 Tommy Mandel – keyboards (1, 2, 3, 5–10), Hammond organ (6)
 Robert Sabino – keyboards (4)
 Keith Scott – lead guitar (1, 2, 3, 5–10), rhythm guitar (1, 2, 3), backing vocals (2, 5, 10), handclaps (2), guitars (4), gang vocals (7)
 Dave Taylor – bass
 Pat Steward – drums (1, 6, 7), gang vocals (7)
 Mickey Curry – drums (2, 3, 5, 8–10)
 Steve Smith – drums (4)
 Jim Vallance – percussion (1, 2, 3, 5, 6)
 Jody Perpick – handclaps (2), gang vocals (7)
 Lou Gramm – backing vocals (2)
 Gerry Berg – gang vocals (7)
 John Eddie – backing vocals (5)
 Bob Clearmountain – gang vocals (7)
 Tina Turner – lead vocals (8)

Production 
 Bryan Adams – producer
 Bob Clearmountain – producer, engineer, mixing
 Jim Vallance – associate producer
 Mike Fraser – assistant engineer
 Michael Sauvage – assistant engineer
 Bruce Lampcov – assistant engineer
 Bob Ludwig – mastering
 Masterdisk (New York, NY) – mastering location
 Chuck Beeson – art direction, design
 Richard Frankel – art direction
 Hiro (51) – front cover photography
 Jim O’Mara – inner sleeve photography
 Bruce Allen – management

Charts

Weekly charts

Year-end charts

All-time chart

Certifications

See also 
 List of diamond-certified albums in Canada

References 

1984 albums
Bryan Adams albums
A&M Records albums
Albums produced by Bob Clearmountain
Albums recorded at Little Mountain Sound Studios
Juno Award for Album of the Year albums